Conospermum crassinervium, commonly known as the summer smokebush or tassel smokebush, is a shrub endemic to Western Australia.

It blooms between October and April producing white flowers. It has an upright habit and produces about 25 flowering stems per plant which produce white flowers mostly during summer between December and February. The shrub grows fairly slowly and forms flowers in a corymb arrangement forming a tassel.

The species was first formally described by the botanist Carl Meissner 1856 as part of Augustin Pyramus de Candolles work Proteaceae. Prodromus Systematis Naturalis Regni Vegetabilis. The only synonym is Conospermum crassinervium.

It is found on hill slopes and sand plain areas in the Wheatbelt and Swan Coastal Plain regions of Western Australia where it grows in sandy soils often over laterite or limestone.

The plant is suitable for the production of cut flowers although the yield is low. The flowers also dry well.

References

External links

crassinervium
Endemic flora of Western Australia
Eudicots of Western Australia
Plants described in 1856
Taxa named by Carl Meissner